"The Quittin' Kind" is a song recorded by American country music artist Joe Diffie.  It was released in September 1999 as the second single from the album A Night to Remember.  The song reached #21 on the Billboard Hot Country Singles & Tracks chart.  The song was written by Phil Barnhart, Sam Hogin and Mark D. Sanders.

Chart performance

References

1999 singles
1999 songs
Joe Diffie songs
Epic Records singles
Songs written by Mark D. Sanders
Song recordings produced by Don Cook
Songs written by Phil Barnhart (songwriter)
Songs written by Sam Hogin